Liafensine (BMS-820836) is a serotonin-norepinephrine-dopamine reuptake inhibitor (SNDRI) which was under development by Bristol-Myers Squibb for the treatment of major depressive disorder. Though it demonstrated comparable effectiveness to escitalopram and duloxetine in phase II clinical trials, development was paused in 2013 because liafensine failed to show superior effectiveness relative to these drugs, a decision that was made likely based on its increased capacity for side effects as well as potential for abuse.

See also
 Amitifadine
 Ansofaxine

References

Antidepressants
Serotonin–norepinephrine–dopamine reuptake inhibitors